Limoges CSP history and statistics in FIBA Europe and Euroleague Basketball (company) competitions.

1980s

1981–82 FIBA Korać Cup, 3rd–tier
The 1981–82 FIBA Korać Cup was the 11th installment of the European 3rd-tier level professional basketball club competition FIBA Korać Cup, running from October 7, 1981, to March 18, 1982. The trophy was won by Limoges CSP, who defeated Šibenka by a result of 90–84 at Palasport San Lazzaro in Padua, Italy. Overall, Limoges CSP achieved in present competition a record of 9 wins against 4 defeats, in five successive rounds. More detailed:

First round
 Tie played on October 7, 1981, and on October 14, 1981.

|}

Second round
 Tie played on November 4, 1981, and on November 11, 1981.

|}

Top 16
 Day 1 (December 9, 1981)

|}

 Day 2 (December 16, 1981)

|}

 Day 3 (January 13, 1982)

|}

 Day 4 (January 20, 1982)

|}

 Day 5 (January 27, 1982)

|}

 Day 6 (February 3, 1982)

|}

 Group A standings:

Semifinals
 Tie played on February 17, 1982, and on February 24, 1982.

|}

Final
 March 18, 1982, at Palasport San Lazzaro in Padua, Italy.

|}

1982–83 FIBA Korać Cup, 3rd–tier
The 1982–83 FIBA Korać Cup was the 12th installment of the European 3rd-tier level professional basketball club competition FIBA Korać Cup, running from October 6, 1982, to March 8, 1983. The trophy was won by the title holder Limoges CSP, who defeated -for second consecutive time- Šibenka by a result of 94–86 at Deutschlandhalle in West Berlin, West Germany. Overall, Limoges CSP achieved in present competition a record of 7 wins against 2 defeats, in five successive rounds. More detailed:

First round
 Bye

Second round
 Bye

Top 16
 Day 1 (December 8, 1982)

|}

 Day 2 (December 15, 1982)

|}

 Day 3 (January 12, 1983)

|}

 Day 4 (January 19, 1983)

|}

 Day 5 (January 26, 1983)

|}

 Day 6 (February 2, 1983)

|}

 Group A standings:

Semifinals
 Tie played on February 16, 1983, and on February 23, 1983.

|}

Final
 March 8, 1983, at Deutschlandhalle in West Berlin, West Germany.

|}

1983–84 FIBA European Champions Cup, 1st–tier
The 1980–81 FIBA European Champions Cup was the 27th installment of the European top-tier level professional basketball club competition FIBA European Champions Cup (now called EuroLeague), running from September 15, 1983, to March 29, 1984. The trophy was won by Banco di Roma, who defeated FC Barcelona by a result of 79–73 at Patinoire des Vernets in Geneva, Switzerland. Overall, Limoges CSP achieved in the present competition a record of 5 wins against 9 defeats, in four successive rounds. More detailed:

First round
 Bye

Second round
 Tie played on September 29, 1983, and on October 6, 1983.

|}

Top 12
 Tie played on October 27, 1983, and on November 3, 1983.

|}

Semifinals
 Day 1 (December 8, 1983)

|}

 Day 2 (December 15, 1983)

|}

 Day 3 (January 11, 1984)

|}

 Day 4 (January 18, 1984)

|}

 Day 5 (January 25, 1984)

|}
*Two overtimes at the end of regulation (97–97 and 107–107).

 Day 6 (February 2, 1984)

|}

 Day 7 (February 16, 1984)

|}
*Two overtimes at the end of regulation (86–86 and 98–98).

 Day 8 (February 23, 1984)

|}

 Day 9 (February 29, 1984)

|}

 Day 10 (March 8, 1984)

|}

 Semifinals group stage standings:

1984–85 FIBA European Champions Cup, 1st–tier
The 1984–85 FIBA European Champions Cup was the 28th installment of the European top-tier level professional basketball club competition FIBA European Champions Cup (now called EuroLeague), running from September 21, 1984, to April 3, 1985. The trophy was won by Cibona, who defeated Real Madrid by a result of 87–78 at Peace and Friendship Stadium in Piraeus, Greece. Overall, Limoges CSP achieved in the present competition a record of 2 wins against 2 defeats, in three successive rounds. More detailed:

First round
 Bye

Second round
 Tie played on October 4, 1984, and on October 11, 1984.

|}

Top 12
 Tie played on November 1, 1984, and on November 8, 1984.

|}

1985–86 FIBA European Champions Cup, 1st–tier
The 1985–86 FIBA European Champions Cup was the 29th installment of the European top-tier level professional basketball club competition FIBA European Champions Cup (now called EuroLeague), running from September 19, 1985, to April 3, 1986. The trophy was won by Cibona, who defeated Žalgiris by a result of 94–82 at Sportcsarnok in Budapest, Hungary. Overall, Limoges CSP achieved in the present competition a record of 3 wins against 11 defeats, in four successive rounds. More detailed:

First round
 Bye

Second round
 Tie played on October 3, 1985, and on October 10, 1985.

|}

Top 12
 Tie played on October 31, 1985, and on November 7, 1985.

|}

Semifinals
 Day 1 (December 5, 1985)

|}

 Day 2 (December 12, 1985)

|}

 Day 3 (January 9, 1986)

|}
*Overtime at the end of regulation (77–77).

 Day 4 (January 16, 1986)

|}

 Day 5 (January 22, 1986)

|}

 Day 6 (January 30, 1986)

|}

 Day 7 (February 20, 1986)

|}

 Day 8 (February 27, 1986)

|}

 Day 9 (March 6, 1986)

|}

 Day 10 (March 12, 1986)

|}

 Semifinals group stage standings:

1986–87 FIBA Korać Cup, 3rd–tier
The 1986–87 FIBA Korać Cup was the 16th installment of the European 3rd-tier level professional basketball club competition FIBA Korać Cup, running from October 1, 1986, to March 25, 1987. The trophy was won by FC Barcelona, who defeated Limoges CSP by a result of 203–171 in a two-legged final on a home and away basis. Overall, Limoges CSP achieved in present competition a record of 7 wins against 3 defeats, in five successive rounds. More detailed:

First round
 Bye

Second round
 Bye

Top 16
 Day 1 (December 3, 1986)

|}

 Day 2 (December 10, 1986)

|}

 Day 3 (January 7, 1987)

|}

 Day 4 (January 14, 1987)

|}

 Day 5 (January 21, 1987)

|}

 Day 6 (January 28, 1987)

|}

 Group A standings:

Semifinals
 Tie played on February 18, 1987, and on February 25, 1987.

|}

Finals
 Tie played on March 18, 1987, at Palau Blaugrana in Barcelona, Spain and on March 25, 1987, at Palais des Sports de Beaublanc in Limoges, France.

|}

1987–88 FIBA European Cup Winners' Cup, 2nd–tier
The 1987–88 FIBA European Cup Winners' Cup was the 22nd installment of FIBA's 2nd-tier level European-wide professional club basketball competition FIBA European Cup Winners' Cup (lately called FIBA Saporta Cup), running from September 22, 1987, to March 16, 1988. The trophy was won by Limoges CSP, who defeated Ram Joventut by a result of 96–89 at Palais des Sports in Grenoble, France. Overall, Limoges CSP achieved in the present competition a record of 10 wins against 1 defeat, in five successive rounds. More detailed:

First round
 Bye

Second round
 Tie played on October 13, 1987, and on October 20, 1987.

|}

Quarterfinals
 Day 1 (December 2, 1987)

|}

 Day 2 (December 8, 1987)

|}

 Day 3 (December 15, 1987)

|}

 Day 4 (January 5, 1988)

|}

 Day 5 (January 13, 1988)

|}

 Day 6 (January 19, 1988)

|}

 Group A standings:

Semifinals
 Tie played on February 9, 1988, and on February 16, 1988.

|}

Final
 March 16, 1988, at Palais des Sports in Grenoble, France.

|}

1988–89 FIBA European Champions Cup, 1st–tier
The 1988–89 FIBA European Champions Cup was the 32nd installment of the European top-tier level professional basketball club competition FIBA European Champions Cup (now called EuroLeague), running from October 13, 1988, to April 6, 1989. The trophy was won by Jugoplastika, who defeated Maccabi Tel Aviv by a result of 75–69 at Olympiahalle in Munich, West Germany. Overall, Limoges CSP achieved in the present competition a record of 7 wins against 9 defeats, in three successive rounds. More detailed:

First round
 Bye

Top 16
 Tie played on November 3, 1988, and on November 10, 1988.

|}

Quarterfinals
 Day 1 (December 8, 1988)

|}

 Day 2 (December 14, 1988)

|}

 Day 3 (December 22, 1988)

|}

 Day 4 (January 5, 1989)

|}

 Day 5 (January 12, 1989)

|}

 Day 6 (January 19, 1989)

|}

 Day 7 (January 25, 1989)

|}

 Day 8 (February 1, 1989)

|}

 Day 9 (February 16, 1989)

|}

 Day 10 (February 23, 1989)

|}

 Day 11 (March 1, 1989)

|}

 Day 12 (March 8, 1989)

|}

 Day 13 (March 16, 1989)

|}

 Day 14 (March 22, 1989)

|}

 Quarterfinals group stage standings:

1990s

1989–90 FIBA European Champions Cup, 1st–tier
The 1989–90 FIBA European Champions Cup was the 33rd installment of the European top-tier level professional basketball club competition FIBA European Champions Cup (now called EuroLeague), running from September 28, 1989, to April 19, 1990. The trophy was won by Jugoplastika, who defeated FC Barcelona Banca Catalana by a result of 72–67 at Pabellón Príncipe Felipe in Zaragoza, Spain. Overall, Limoges CSP achieved in the present competition a record of 13 wins against 5 defeats, in five successive rounds. More detailed:

First round
 Bye

Top 16
 Tie played on October 26, 1989, and on November 2, 1989.

|}

Quarterfinals
 Day 1 (December 7, 1989)

|}

 Day 2 (December 14, 1989)

|}

 Day 3 (January 4, 1990)

|}

 Day 4 (January 11, 1990)

|}

 Day 5 (January 18, 1990)

|}

 Day 6 (January 24, 1990)

|}

 Day 7 (February 1, 1990)

|}

 Day 8 (February 8, 1990)

|}

 Day 9 (February 22, 1990)

|}

 Day 10 (March 1, 1990)

|}

 Day 11 (March 8, 1990)

|}

 Day 12 (March 15, 1990)

|}

 Day 13 (March 21, 1990)

|}

 Day 14 (March 29, 1990)

|}

 Quarterfinals group stage standings:

Final four
The 1990 FIBA European Champions Cup Final Four, was the 1989–90 season's FIBA European Champions Cup Final Four tournament, organized by FIBA Europe.

 Semifinals: April 17, 1990, at Pabellón Príncipe Felipe in Zaragoza, Spain.

|}

 3rd place game: April 19, 1990, at Pabellón Príncipe Felipe in Zaragoza, Spain.

|}

 Final four standings:

1990–91 FIBA European Champions Cup, 1st–tier
The 1990–91 FIBA European Champions Cup was the 34th installment of the European top-tier level professional basketball club competition FIBA European Champions Cup (now called EuroLeague), running from September 27, 1990, to April 18, 1991. The trophy was won by POP 84, who defeated FC Barcelona Banca Catalana by a result of 70–65 at Palais Omnisports de Paris-Bercy in Paris, France. Overall, Limoges CSP achieved in the present competition a record of 5 wins against 11 defeats, in three successive rounds. More detailed:

First round
 Bye

Top 16
 Tie played on October 25, 1990, and on November 1, 1990.

|}

Quarterfinals
 Day 1 (December 13, 1990)

|}

 Day 2 (December 20, 1990)

|}

 Day 3 (January 3, 1991)

|}

 Day 4 (January 10, 1991)

|}

 Day 5 (January 16, 1991)

|}

 Day 6 (January 24, 1991)

|}

 Day 7 (January 31, 1991)

|}

 Day 8 (February 7, 1991)

|}

 Day 9 (February 14, 1991)

|}

 Day 10 (February 28, 1991)

|}

 Day 11 (March 7, 1991)

|}

 Day 12 (March 13, 1991)

|}

 Day 13 (March 21, 1991)

|}

 Day 14 (March 28, 1991)

|}

 Quarterfinals group stage standings:

1991–92 FIBA European Cup, 2nd–tier
The 1991–92 FIBA European Cup was the 26th installment of FIBA's 2nd-tier level European-wide professional club basketball competition FIBA European Cup (lately called FIBA Saporta Cup), running from September 10, 1991, to March 17, 1992. The trophy was won by Real Madrid Asegurator, who defeated the title holder PAOK by a result of 65–63 at Palais des Sports de Beaulieu in Nantes, France. Overall, Limoges CSP achieved in the present competition a record of 8 wins against 6 defeats, in four successive rounds. More detailed:

First round
 Bye

Second round
 Tie played on October 1, 1991, and on October 8, 1991.

|}

Third round
 Tie played on October 29, 1991, and on November 5, 1991.

|}

Top 12
 Day 1 (November 26, 1991)

|}

 Day 2 (December 3, 1991)

|}

 Day 3 (December 11, 1991)

|}

 Day 4 (December 17, 1991)

|}

 Day 5 (January 7, 1992)

|}

 Day 6 (January 15, 1992)

|}

 Day 7 (January 21, 1992)

|}

 Day 8 (January 28, 1992)

|}

 Day 9 (February 5, 1992)

|}

 Day 10 (February 11, 1992)

|}

 Group A standings:

1992–93 FIBA European League, 1st–tier
The 1992–93 FIBA European League was the 36th installment of the European top-tier level professional club competition for basketball clubs (now called EuroLeague), running from September 10, 1992, to April 15, 1993. The trophy was won by Limoges CSP, who defeated Benetton Treviso by a result of 59–55 at Peace and Friendship Stadium in Piraeus, Greece. Overall, Limoges CSP achieved in present competition a record of 12 wins against 6 defeats plus 1 draw, in six successive rounds. More detailed:

First round
 Bye

Second round
 Tie played on September 30, 1992, and on October 8, 1992.

|}

Top 16
 Day 1 (October 29, 1992)
Bye: Partizan was the title holder but was not allowed to compete due to United Nations embargo on FR Yugoslavia.

 Day 2 (November 5, 1992)

|}

 Day 3 (November 26, 1992)

|}

 Day 4 (December 3, 1992)

|}

 Day 5 (December 10, 1992)

|}

 Day 6 (December 17, 1992)

|}

 Day 7 (January 7, 1993)

|}

 Day 8 (January 14, 1993)
Bye: Partizan was the title holder but was not allowed to compete due to United Nations embargo on FR Yugoslavia.

 Day 9 (January 20, 1993)

|}

 Day 10 (January 28, 1993)

|}

 Day 11 (February 4, 1993)

|}

 Day 12 (February 10, 1993)

|}

 Day 13 (February 18, 1993)

|}

 Day 14 (February 25, 1993)

|}

 Group A standings:

Quarterfinals
 Best-of-3 playoff: Game 1 away on March 11, 1993 / Game 2 at home on March 15, 1993 / Game 3 at home on March 17, 1993.

|}

Final four
The 1993 FIBA European League Final Four, was the 1992–93 season's FIBA European League Final Four tournament, organized by FIBA Europe.

 Semifinals: April 13, 1993, at Peace and Friendship Stadium in Piraeus, Greece.

|}

 Final: April 15, 1993, at Peace and Friendship Stadium in Piraeus, Greece.

|}

 Final four standings:

1993–94 FIBA European League, 1st–tier
The 1993–94 FIBA European League was the 37th installment of the European top-tier level professional club competition for basketball clubs (now called EuroLeague), running from September 9, 1993, to April 21, 1994. The trophy was won by 7up Joventut, who defeated Olympiacos by a result of 59–57 at Yad Eliyahu Arena in Tel Aviv, Israel. Overall, Limoges CSP achieved in present competition a record of 10 wins against 7 defeats, in four successive rounds. More detailed:

First round
 Bye

Second round
 Bye

Top 16
 Day 1 (October 28, 1993)

|}
*Overtime at the end of regulation (71–71).

 Day 2 (November 4, 1993)

|}

 Day 3 (November 24, 1993)

|}

 Day 4 (December 1, 1993)

|}

 Day 5 (December 9, 1993)

|}

 Day 6 (December 15, 1993)

|}

 Day 7 (January 6, 1994)

|}

 Day 8 (January 13, 1994)

|}

 Day 9 (January 20, 1994)

|}

 Day 10 (January 27, 1994)

|}

 Day 11 (February 2, 1994)

|}

 Day 12 (February 10, 1994)

|}

 Day 13 (February 16, 1994)

|}

 Day 14 (February 23, 1994)

|}

 Group A standings:

Quarterfinals
 Best-of-3 playoff: Game 1 at home on March 10, 1994 / Game 2 away on March 15, 1994 / Game 3 away on March 17, 1994.

|}

1994–95 FIBA European League, 1st–tier
The 1994–95 FIBA European League was the 38th installment of the European top-tier level professional club competition for basketball clubs (now called EuroLeague), running from September 8, 1994, to April 13, 1995. The trophy was won by Real Madrid Teka, who defeated Olympiacos by a result of 73–61 at Pabellón Príncipe Felipe in Zaragoza, Spain. Overall, Limoges CSP achieved in present competition a record of 14 wins against 7 defeats, in six successive rounds. More detailed:

First round
 Bye

Second round
 Tie played on September 29, 1994, and on October 6, 1994.

|}

Top 16
 Day 1 (October 27, 1994)

|}

 Day 2 (November 2, 1994)

|}

 Day 3 (November 24, 1994)

|}

 Day 4 (December 1, 1994)

|}

 Day 5 (December 8, 1994)

|}

 Day 6 (December 14, 1994)

|}
*Overtime at the end of regulation (48–48).

 Day 7 (January 5, 1995)

|}

 Day 8 (January 12, 1995)

|}

 Day 9 (January 19, 1995)

|}

 Day 10 (January 26, 1995)

|}

 Day 11 (February 2, 1995)

|}

 Day 12 (February 9, 1995)

|}

 Day 13 (February 16, 1995)

|}

 Day 14 (February 23, 1995)

|}

 Group A standings:

Quarterfinals
 Best-of-3 playoff: Game 1 away on March 9, 1995 / Game 2 at home on March 14, 1995 / Game 3 at home on March 16, 1995.

|}

Final four
The 1995 FIBA European League Final Four, was the 1994–95 season's FIBA European League Final Four tournament, organized by FIBA Europe.

 Semifinals: April 11, 1995, at Pabellón Príncipe Felipe in Zaragoza, Spain.

|}

 3rd place game: April 13, 1995, at Pabellón Príncipe Felipe in Zaragoza, Spain.

|}

 Final four standings:

1995–96 FIBA European Cup, 2nd–tier
The 1995–96 FIBA European Cup was the 30th installment of FIBA's 2nd-tier level European-wide professional club basketball competition FIBA European Cup (lately called FIBA Saporta Cup), running from September 5, 1995, to March 12, 1996. The trophy was won by Taugrés, who defeated PAOK by a result of 88–81 at Pabellón Álava in Vitoria-Gasteiz, Spain. Overall, Limoges CSP achieved in the present competition a record of 10 wins against 4 defeats, in four successive rounds. More detailed:

First round
 Bye

Second round
 Tie played on September 26, 1995, and on October 3, 1995.

|}

Third round
 Tie played on October 24, 1995, and on November 1, 1995.

|}

Top 12
 Day 1 (November 21, 1995)

|}

 Day 2 (November 28, 1995)

|}

 Day 3 (December 5, 1995)

|}

 Day 4 (December 12, 1995)

|}

 Day 5 (December 19, 1995)

|}

 Day 6 (January 3, 1996)

|}

 Day 7 (January 9, 1996)

|}

 Day 8 (January 16, 1996)

|}

 Day 9 (January 23, 1996)

|}

 Day 10 (January 30, 1996)

|}

 Group A standings:

1996–97 FIBA EuroLeague, 1st–tier
The 1996–97 FIBA EuroLeague was the 40th installment of the European top-tier level professional club competition for basketball clubs (now called simply EuroLeague), running from September 19, 1996, to April 24, 1997. The trophy was won by Olympiacos, who defeated FC Barcelona Banca Catalana by a result of 73–58 at PalaEUR in Rome, Italy. Overall, Limoges CSP achieved in present competition a record of 8 wins against 10 defeats, in three successive rounds. More detailed:

First round
 Day 1 (September 19, 1996)

|}

 Day 2 (September 26, 1996)

|}

 Day 3 (October 2, 1996)

|}

 Day 4 (October 10, 1996)

|}

 Day 5 (October 17, 1996)

|}

 Day 6 (November 7, 1996)

|}

 Day 7 (November 14, 1996)

|}

 Day 8 (November 21, 1996)

|}

 Day 9 (December 5, 1996)

|}
*Two overtimes at the end of regulation (73–73 and 85–85).

 Day 10 (December 12, 1996)

|}

 Group A standings:

Second round
 Day 1 (January 9, 1997)

|}

 Day 2 (January 16, 1997)

|}

 Day 3 (January 23, 1997)

|}

 Day 4 (February 6, 1997)

|}

 Day 5 (February 13, 1997)

|}

 Day 6 (February 20, 1997)

|}

 Group F standings:

Top 16
 Best-of-3 playoff: Game 1 away on March 6, 1997 / Game 2 at home on March 11, 1997 / Game 3 away on March 13, 1997.

|}

1997–98 FIBA EuroLeague, 1st–tier
The 1997–98 FIBA EuroLeague was the 41st installment of the European top-tier level professional club competition for basketball clubs (now called simply EuroLeague), running from September 18, 1997, to April 23, 1998. The trophy was won by Kinder Bologna, who defeated AEK by a result of 58–44 at Palau Sant Jordi in Barcelona, Spain. Overall, Limoges CSP achieved in present competition a record of 6 wins against 10 defeats, in two successive rounds. More detailed:

First round
 Day 1 (September 18, 1997)

|}

 Day 2 (September 25, 1997)

|}

 Day 3 (October 2, 1997)

|}

 Day 4 (October 9, 1997)

|}

 Day 5 (October 23, 1997)

|}

 Day 6 (November 6, 1997)

|}

 Day 7 (November 12, 1997)

|}

 Day 8 (November 20, 1997)

|}

 Day 9 (December 11, 1997)

|}

 Day 10 (December 18, 1997)

|}

 Group A standings:

Second round
 Day 1 (January 8, 1998)

|}

 Day 2 (January 14, 1998)

|}

 Day 3 (January 22, 1998)

|}

 Day 4 (February 5, 1998)

|}

 Day 5 (February 11, 1998)

|}
*Overtime at the end of regulation (64–64).

 Day 6 (February 19, 1998)

|}

 Group F standings:

1998–99 FIBA Saporta Cup, 2nd–tier
The 1998–99 FIBA Saporta Cup was the 33rd installment of FIBA's 2nd-tier level European-wide professional club basketball competition FIBA Saporta Cup, running from September 22, 1998, to April 13, 1999. The trophy was won by Benetton Treviso, who defeated Pamesa Valencia by a result of 64–60 at Pabellón Príncipe Felipe in Zaragoza, Spain. Overall, Limoges CSP achieved in the present competition a record of 8 wins against 4 defeats, in two successive rounds. More detailed:

First round
 Day 1 (September 22, 1998)

|}

 Day 2 (September 29, 1998)

|}

 Day 3 (October 6, 1998)

|}

 Day 4 (October 13, 1998)

|}

 Day 5 (October 20, 1998)

|}

 Day 6 (November 3, 1998)

|}

 Day 7 (November 10, 1998)

|}

 Day 8 (November 17, 1998)

|}

 Day 9 (December 8, 1998)

|}

 Day 10 (December 15, 1998)

|}

 Group F standings:

Second round
 Tie played on January 12, 1999, and on January 19, 1999.

|}

2000s

1999–2000 FIBA Korać Cup, 3rd–tier
The 1999–2000 FIBA Korać Cup was the 29th installment of the European 3rd-tier level professional basketball club competition FIBA Korać Cup, running from September 15, 1999, to March 29, 2000. The trophy was won by Limoges CSP, who defeated Unicaja by a result of 131–118 in a two-legged final on a home and away basis. Overall, Limoges CSP achieved in present competition a record of 12 wins against 3 defeats plus 1 draw, in seven successive rounds. More detailed:

First round
 Bye

Second round
 Day 1 (October 6, 1999)

|}

 Day 2 (October 13, 1999)

|}

 Day 3 (October 20, 1999)

|}

 Day 4 (November 3, 1999)

|}

 Day 5 (November 10, 1999)

|}

 Day 6 (November 17, 1999)

|}

 Group I standings:

Third round
 Tie played on December 8, 1999, and on December 15, 1999.

|}

Top 16
 Tie played on January 12, 2000, and on January 19, 2000.

|}

Quarterfinals
 Tie played on February 9, 2000, and on February 16, 2000.

|}

Semifinals
 Tie played on March 1, 2000, and on March 8, 2000.

|}

Finals
 Tie played on March 22, 2000, at Palais des Sports de Beaublanc in Limoges, France and on March 29, 2000, at Pabellón Ciudad Jardín in Málaga, Spain.

|}

2010s

2014–15 Turkish Airlines Euroleague, 1st–tier
The 2014–15 Turkish Airlines Euroleague was the 15th season of the EuroLeague, under the Euroleague Basketball Company's authority, and it was the 58th installment of the European top-tier level professional club competition for basketball clubs, running from September 23, 2014, to May 17, 2015. The trophy was won by Real Madrid, who defeated Olympiacos by a result of 78–59 at Barclaycard Center in Madrid, Spain. Overall, Limoges CSP achieved in present competition a record of 2 wins against 8 defeats, in only one round. More detailed:

Regular season
 Day 1 (October 16, 2014)

|}

 Day 2 (October 24, 2014)

|}

 Day 3 (October 31, 2014)

|}

 Day 4 (November 7, 2014)

|}

 Day 5 (November 14, 2014)

|}

 Day 6 (November 20, 2014)

|}

 Day 7 (November 28, 2014)

|}

 Day 8 (December 5, 2014)

|}

 Day 9 (December 12, 2014)

|}

 Day 10 (December 18, 2014)

|}

 Group B standings:

Bottom two teams in each group entered 2014–15 Eurocup Basketball Last 32 round.

2014–15 Eurocup Basketball, 2nd–tier
The 2014–15 Eurocup Basketball was the 13th installment of ULEB's 2nd-tier level European-wide professional club basketball competition EuroCup Basketball, running from October 15, 2014, to April 29, 2015. The trophy was won by Khimki, who defeated Herbalife Gran Canaria by a result of 174–130 in a two-legged final on a home and away basis. Overall, Limoges CSP achieved in the present competition a record of 3 wins against 3 defeats, in only one round. More detailed:

Last 32
 Day 1 (January 7, 2015)

|}

 Day 2 (January 14, 2015)

|}

 Day 3 (January 20, 2015)

|}

 Day 4 (January 28, 2015)

|}

 Day 5 (February 4, 2015)

|}

 Day 6 (February 10, 2015)

|}

 Group J standings:

2015–16 Turkish Airlines Euroleague, 1st–tier
The 2015–16 Turkish Airlines Euroleague was the 16th season of the EuroLeague, under the Euroleague Basketball Company's authority, and it was the 59th installment of the European top-tier level professional club competition for basketball clubs, running from October 15, 2015, to May 15, 2016. The trophy was won by CSKA Moscow, who defeated Fenerbahçe by a result of 101–96 (OT) at Mercedes-Benz Arena in Berlin, Germany. Overall, Limoges CSP achieved in present competition a record of 3 wins against 7 defeats, in only one round. More detailed:

Regular season
 Day 1 (October 16, 2015)

|}

 Day 2 (October 22, 2015)

|}

 Day 3 (October 29, 2015)

|}

 Day 4 (November 5, 2015)

|}

 Day 5 (November 12, 2015)

|}

 Day 6 (November 20, 2015)

|}

 Day 7 (November 26, 2015)

|}

 Day 8 (December 3, 2015)

|}

 Day 9 (December 10, 2015)

|}

 Day 10 (December 18, 2015)

|}

 Group B standings:

Bottom two teams in each group entered 2015–16 Eurocup Basketball Last 32 round.

2015–16 Eurocup Basketball, 2nd–tier
The 2015–16 Eurocup Basketball was the 14th installment of ULEB's 2nd-tier level European-wide professional club basketball competition EuroCup Basketball, running from October 14, 2015, to April 27, 2016. The trophy was won by Galatasaray Odeabank, who defeated SIG Strasbourg by a result of 140–133 in a two-legged final on a home and away basis. Overall, Limoges CSP achieved in the present competition a record of 4 wins against 4 defeats, in two successive rounds. More detailed:

Last 32
 Day 1 (January 5, 2016)

|}

 Day 2 (January 12, 2016)

|}

 Day 3 (January 19, 2016)

|}

 Day 4 (January 26, 2016)

|}

 Day 5 (February 3, 2016)

|}

 Day 6 (February 10, 2016)

|}

 Group I standings:

Top 16
 Tie played on February 24, 2016, and on March 2, 2016.

|}

2017–18 EuroCup Basketball, 2nd–tier
The 2017–18 EuroCup Basketball was the 16th installment of ULEB's 2nd-tier level European-wide professional club basketball competition EuroCup Basketball, running from October 11, 2017, to April 13, 2018. The trophy was won by Darüşşafaka, who defeated Lokomotiv Kuban by a result of 2–0 wins in a Best-of-3 final series. Overall, Limoges CSP achieved in the present competition a record of 6 wins against 10 defeats, in two successive rounds. More detailed:

Regular season
 Day 1 (October 11, 2017)

|}

 Day 2 (October 18, 2017)

|}

 Day 3 (October 24, 2017)

|}

 Day 4 (October 31, 2017)

|}

 Day 5 (November 7, 2017)

|}

 Day 6 (November 15, 2017)

|}

 Day 7 (December 5, 2017)

|}

 Day 8 (December 12, 2017)

|}

 Day 9 (December 19, 2017)

|}

 Day 10 (December 26, 2017)

|}

 Group C standings:

Rules for classification: All points scored in extra period(s) were not counted in the standings, nor for any tie-break situation.

Top 16
 Day 1 (January 2, 2018)

|}

 Day 2 (January 9, 2018)

|}

 Day 3 (January 17, 2018)

|}

 Day 4 (January 24, 2018)

|}

 Day 5 (January 30, 2018)

|}

 Day 6 (February 7, 2018)

|}

 Group H standings:

Rules for classification: All points scored in extra period(s) were not counted in the standings, nor for any tie-break situation.

2018–19 EuroCup Basketball, 2nd–tier
The 2018–19 EuroCup Basketball was the 17th installment of ULEB's 2nd-tier level European-wide professional club basketball competition EuroCup Basketball, running from October 3, 2018, to April 15, 2019. The trophy was won by Valencia Basket, who defeated Alba Berlin by a result of 2–1 wins in a Best-of-3 final series. Overall, Limoges CSP achieved in the present competition a record of 5 wins against 11 defeats, in two successive rounds. More detailed:

Regular season
 Day 1 (October 3, 2018)

|}

 Day 2 (October 10, 2018)

|}

 Day 3 (October 17, 2018)

|}

 Day 4 (October 23, 2018)

|}

 Day 5 (October 31, 2018)

|}

 Day 6 (November 7, 2018)

|}

 Day 7 (November 14, 2018)

|}

 Day 8 (November 21, 2018)

|}

 Day 9 (December 11, 2018)

|}

 Day 10 (December 19, 2018)

|}

 Group B standings:

Rules for classification: All points scored in extra period(s) were not counted in the standings, nor for any tie-break situation.

Top 16
 Day 1 (January 2, 2019)

|}

 Day 2 (January 9, 2019)

|}

 Day 3 (January 15, 2019)

|}

 Day 4 (January 23, 2019)

|}

 Day 5 (January 29, 2019)

|}

 Day 6 (February 6, 2019)

|}

 Group G standings:

Rules for classification: All points scored in extra period(s) were not counted in the standings, nor for any tie-break situation.

Worldwide and other prestigious (semi-official) European competitions

1985 III ACB International Tournament "II Memorial Héctor Quiroga"
The 1985 III ACB International Tournament "II Memorial Héctor Quiroga" was the 3rd semi-official installment of the European Basketball Club Super Cup for men's professional basketball clubs, running from September 6, 1985, to September 8, 1985. It took place at Pabellón Municipal in Puerto Real and the trophy was won by Winston All Star.

Round-robin tournament
 Day 1 (September 6, 1985)

|}

 Day 2 (September 7, 1985)

|}

 Day 3 (September 8, 1985)

|}

 Final standings:

1990 XXVI FIBA International Christmas Tournament
The 1990 XXVI FIBA International Christmas Tournament "Trofeo Raimundo Saporta-Memorial Fernando Martín" was the 26th installment of the international men's professional basketball club tournament FIBA International Christmas Tournament, running from December 24, 1990, to December 26, 1990. It took place at Palacio de Deportes de la Comunidad de Madrid in Madrid, Spain and the trophy was won by Real Madrid Otaysa.

Round-robin tournament
 Day 1 (December 24, 1990)

|}

 Day 2 (December 25, 1990)

|}

 Day 3 (December 26, 1990)

|}

 Final standings:

1991 McDonald's Open
The 1991 McDonald's Open was the 5th installment of the international men's professional basketball club tournament McDonald's Open (lately called McDonald's Championship), running from October 18, 1991, to October 19, 1991. It took place at Palais Omnisports de Paris-Bercy in Paris, France and the trophy was won by Los Angeles Lakers, who defeated Montigalà Joventut by a result of 116–114.

Semifinals
 18 October 1991 at Palais Omnisports de Paris-Bercy in Paris, France.

|}

3rd place game
 19 October 1991 at Palais Omnisports de Paris-Bercy in Paris, France.

|}

 Final standings:

1993 McDonald's Open
The 1993 McDonald's Open was the 6th installment of the international men's professional basketball club tournament McDonald's Open (lately called McDonald's Championship), running from October 21, 1993, to October 23, 1993. It took place at Olympiahalle in Munich, Germany and the trophy was won by Phoenix Suns, who defeated Buckler Beer Bologna by a result of 112–90.

Preliminary round
 October 21, 1993, at Olympiahalle in Munich, Germany.
Bye

Semifinals
 October 22, 1993, at Olympiahalle in Munich, Germany.

|}

3rd place game
 October 23, 1993, at Olympiahalle in Munich, Germany.

|}

 Final standings:

Record
Limoges CSP has overall, from 1981–82 (first participation) to 2015–16 (last participation): 168 wins against 126 defeats plus 2 draws in 296 games for all the European club competitions.

 EuroLeague: 90–92 plus 1 (183)
 FIBA Saporta Cup: 36–15 (51) /// EuroCup Basketball: 7–7 (14)
 FIBA Korać Cup: 35–12 plus 1 (48)

Also Limoges has a 1–3 record in the McDonald's Championship.

References

Basketball teams in France